Sunrise in the Tone World is an album by American jazz double bassist William Parker, which was recorded live in 1995 and released on the AUM Fidelity label.

This is the second recording by William Parker & The Little Huey Creative Music Orchestra, a big band founded in January 1994. The ensemble takes its name from Huey Jackson, a fledgling poet who died before he turned 18. "Voice Dancer Kidd" is dedicated to Kidd Jordan. "Sunship for Dexter" is for Dexter Gordon. "The Painter and the Poet" is a duet between Marco Eneidi and Gregg Bendian.

Reception

In his review for AllMusic, Don Snowden states "The freewheeling 25-piece (plus guests) unit can be a lumbering behemoth, but one that's very nimble on its feet, and this strong two-CD set meets a prime goal of this music by taking the listener on a musical and emotional voyage."

The Penguin Guide to Jazz notes that "Their roots are in Trane's Ascension, in Mingus' sprawling big bands and in Sun Ra's Arkestra; but they also had strong affinities with Butch Morris' conducted improvisation and with Anthony Braxton mythic-realist fantasy pieces."

The JazzTimes review by Fred Bouchard states "This 20-piece ensemble develops a powerful synergy out of strong if inchoate ideas of a humanistic and creative revolution welling from the heart and bowels of Brooklyn."

Track listing
All compositions by William Parker.

Disc one
 "Sunrise in the Tone World" – 12:14 
 "The Bluest J" – 26:05 
 "Voice Dancer Kidd" – 7:44
 "Mayan Space Station" – 14:10

Disc two
 "Hiey Sees Light Through a Leaf" – 40:10 
 "Sunship for Dexter" – 9:55 
 "And Again" – 5:40
 "The Painter and the Poet" – 5:43

Personnel

William Parker – bass
Roy Campbell – trumpet, pocket trumpet, flugelhorn
Lewis Barnes – trumpet
Richard Rodriguez – trumpet
Alex Lodico – trombone
Masahiko Kono – trombone
Steve Swell – trombone
Chris Jonas – soprano sax
Darryl Foster – soprano sax
Rob Brown – alto sax
Will Connell – alto sax, bass clarinet, flute
Mabo Suzuki – alto sax
Marco Eneidi – alto sax
Richard Keene – tenor sax
Assif Tsahar – tenor sax
Ben Koen – tenor sax
Dave Swelson – baritone sax
Joe Ruddick – baritone sax
Gregg Bendian – vibes
Cooper-Moore – piano
Akira Ando – cello
Hal Onserud – bass
Dave Hofstra – tuba
Susie Ibarra – drums
Special Guests:
Lisa Sokolov – voice
Vinny Golia – reeds
Jason Hwang – violin
John King – dobro

References

1997 albums
William Parker (musician) live albums
AUM Fidelity live albums
Albums recorded at the Knitting Factory